The Kac–Bernstein theorem  is one of the first characterization theorems of mathematical statistics. It is easy to see that if the random variables   and   are independent and normally distributed with the same variance, then their sum and difference are also independent. The Kac–Bernstein theorem states that the independence of the sum and difference of two independent random variables characterizes the normal distribution (the Gauss distribution). This theorem was proved independently by Polish-American mathematician Mark Kac and Soviet mathematician Sergei Bernstein.

Formulation 
Let    and   are independent random variables. If    and   are independent then    and   have normal distributions (the Gaussian distribution).

Generalization 
A generalization of the Kac–Bernstein theorem is the Darmois–Skitovich theorem, in which instead of sum and difference linear forms from n independent random variables are considered.

References 

 Kac M. "On a characterization of the normal distribution," American Journal of Mathematics. 1939. 61. pp. 726—728.
 Bernstein S. N. "On a property which characterizes a Gaussian distribution," Proceedings of the Leningrad Polytechnic Institute. 1941. V. 217, No 3. pp. 21—22.

Theorems in statistics
Normal distribution